Ellsworth is a city in Hamilton County, Iowa, United States. The population was 508 at the time of the 2020 census.

History
Ellsworth was platted in 1880. It was named to honor the memory of Elmer E. Ellsworth, of the Chicago Zouaves who was murdered in Virginia in the early days of the war of the rebellion. .

Geography
Ellsworth's longitude and latitude coordinates in decimal form are 42.311954, -93.580868.

Demographics

2010 census
As of the census of 2010, there were 531 people, 213 households, and 145 families living in the city. The racial makeup of the city was 92.1% White, 0.2% African American, 2.1% Native American, 0.4% Asian, 4.1% from other races, and 1.1% from two or more races. Hispanic or Latino of any race were 6.8% of the population.

There were 213 households, of which 32.4% had children under the age of 18 living with them, 50.2% were married couples living together, 12.7% had a female householder with no husband present, 5.2% had a male householder with no wife present, and 31.9% were non-families. 25.8% of all households were made up of individuals, and 12.2% had someone living alone who was 65 years of age or older. The average household size was 2.49 and the average family size was 3.00.

The median age in the city was 36.1 years. 27.3% of residents were under the age of 18; 7.5% were between the ages of 18 and 24; 26.2% were from 25 to 44; 24.8% were from 45 to 64; and 14.3% were 65 years of age or older. The gender makeup of the city was 47.8% male and 52.2% female.

2000 census
At the 2000 census, there were 531 people, 204 households and 138 families living in the city. The racial makeup of the city was 91.90% White, 1.32% Native American, 6.03% from other races, and 0.75% from two or more races. Hispanic or Latino of any race were 11.49% of the population.

There were 204 households, of which 34.8% had children under the age of 18 living with them, 54.4% were married couples living together, 11.8% had a female householder with no husband present, and 31.9% were non-families. 27.0% of all households were made up of individuals, and 15.7% had someone living alone who was 65 years of age or older. The average household size was 2.60 and the average family size was 3.17.

29.4% of the population were under the age of 18, 10.5% from 18 to 24, 29.4% from 25 to 44, 15.4% from 45 to 64, and 15.3% who were 65 years of age or older. The median age was 32 years. For every 100 females, there were 92.4 males. For every 100 females age 18 and over, there were 89.4 males.

The median household income was $30,893 and the median family was $36,250. Males had a median income of $28,365 versus $21,250 for females. The per capita income for the city was $15,299. About 8.3% of families and 11.2% of the population were below the poverty line, including 16.5% of those under age 18 and 11.0% of those age 65 or over.

Education
South Hamilton Community School District serves this community.

References

External links
 Welcome to Ellsworth, Iowa

Cities in Iowa
Cities in Hamilton County, Iowa